Asir (also Romanized as Asīr; also known as Sīr) is the oldest city and capital of Asir District, in Mohr County, Fars Province, Iran. This city has a historical and religious place such as tombe bot, jamea mosque, and chak chak waterfall.  At the 2006 census, its population was 2,181, in 465 families.

References

Populated places in Mohr County

Cities in Fars Province